Argestidae is a family of copepods belonging to the order Harpacticoida.

Genera:
 Actinocletodes Fiers, 1986
 Argestes Sars, 1910
 Argestigens Willey, 1935

References

Copepods